9/16 may refer to:

September 16, the 259th day of the year (260th in leap years) in the Gregorian calendar.
Time signature, a notional convention used in Western musical notation.